Edmund Ward (November 2, 1948 – May 3, 2021) was an American writer and radio commentator, the "rock-and-roll historian" for NPR's program Fresh Air from 1987 to 2017 and one of the original founders of Austin's South by Southwest music festival.

Ward grew up in Eastchester, New York. He attended Antioch College and began his music-writing career in 1965. 

He was on the staff of Crawdaddy! (1967), Rolling Stone (1970), and Creem (1971–1977) magazines and of the Austin American-Statesman and The Austin Chronicle (where he was honored as part of their annual "Restaurant Poll", lending his name to their "Ed Ward Memorial Sandwich" award). Ward wrote several books on the history of rock-and-roll and has contributed content, with Rashod Ollison, for the PBS website for the documentary series Get Up, Stand Up: The Story of Pop and Protest. In addition to his music history lessons on NPR's Fresh Air he contributed to The New York Times, The Wall Street Journal, and various music magazines. Ward was the original co-host of the "Let It Roll" podcast and appeared on 24 episodes of the series.

Ward lived in Berlin, Germany between 1993 and 2008, when he moved to Montpellier, France. In 2013 he repatriated and was living in Austin, Texas, at the time of his death.

Works 

 Rock of Ages: The Rolling Stone History of Rock & Roll (1983), with Geoffrey Stokes and Ken Tucker
 Michael Bloomfield: The Rise and Fall of an American Guitar Hero (1983)
 The History of Rock & Roll, Volume 1: 1920-1963 (2016)
 The History of Rock & Roll, Volume 2: 1964–1977 (2019)

References

External links
 Ed Ward's blog
 History of Rock and Roll reviewed by Paste magazine

1948 births
2021 deaths
American expatriates in Germany
American music historians
American male non-fiction writers
Antioch College alumni
Austin American-Statesman people
Historians from New York (state)
NPR personalities
People from Eastchester, New York
Rolling Stone people

20th-century American journalists
American male journalists